Fernando Toranzo Fernández (born September 12, 1950) is a Mexican politician  who served as the Governor of San Luis Potosí (2009-2015). He formerly served as the Health Secretary of San Luis Potosi.

Toranzo Fernández was born in Venado, San Luis Potosi, on September 12, 1950. He was one of eleven children born to Carmen Fernandez de Toranzo and Manuel Contreras. Toranozo Fernandez attended Instituto Carlos Gómez for elementary school. He enrolled at el Bachillerato en la Preparatoria de la Universidad Autónoma de San Luis Potosí before specializing in general surgery at the Facultad de Medicina.

References

1950 births
Governors of San Luis Potosí
Mexican surgeons
Living people
Institutional Revolutionary Party politicians